The Sugar Pot Site is an archaeological site near Ochopee, Florida. It is located in the Big Cypress National Preserve. On December 15, 1978, it was added to the U.S. National Register of Historic Places.

References

 Collier County listings at National Register of Historic Places
 Collier County listings at Florida's Office of Cultural and Historical Programs

National Register of Historic Places in Big Cypress National Preserve
Archaeological sites in Florida
National Register of Historic Places in Collier County, Florida